Aniporn Chalermburanawong (born March 19, 1994) is a Thai actress, model and beauty pageant titleholder who won Miss Universe Thailand 2015. She represented Thailand at the Miss Universe 2015 pageant held in Las Vegas, where she placed top 10 and won Best in National Costume.

Personal life
Aniporn, also known as Natt, was born in Lampang. She graduated From the Social Administration Thammasat University in 2019. She also works as a professional model in Thailand. Chalermburawong began modeling at the age of 17, when she was selected as one of ten finalists in the Thai Supermodel Contest 2011.

Pageantry

Miss Universe Thailand 2015
Aniporn Chalermburanawong was crowned Miss Universe Thailand 2015 on 18 July 2015 at the Royal Paragon Hall, Siam Paragon. Leading up to the pageant, the contestants were hosted in Ubon Ratchathani province before flying back to Bangkok for the final stage. The 16th Annual Miss Universe Thailand pageant was broadcast on Channel 3.

Aniporn Chalermburanawong is the very first woman to take home the Miss Universe Thailand crown from Lampang province. The Miss Universe Thailand 2015 prize package includes a cash prize 1,000,000฿ (one million baht), a crown and jewelry from Beauty Gems, a brand new Toyota Prius car and other prizes worth a total of over 4,000,000฿ (four million baht).

Miss Universe 2015
Aniporn Chalermburanawong represented Thailand at the Miss Universe 2015 pageant on December 20, 2015, at The AXIS, Planet Hollywood Resort and Casino in Las Vegas, Nevada, USA. During her stay, she was roommates with Miss Vietnam Phạm Thị Hương and Miss Dominican Republic Clarissa Molina. An early favorite, she ended Thailand's drought of placements and advanced into the Top 10 as well as winning the Best National Costume award for her tuk tuk inspired costume.

Filmography

Film

Television

Music video

MC
 Television 
 2022 : Top stories, Play Yai (เรื่องเด่น เล่นใหญ่) (produced by The One Enterprise) every Monday - Friday from 14:10 - 14:45 On Air One 31 (Number 31) with Peerawat Atthanak, Krit Jenpanichkan, Chawallakorn Wanthanapisitkul (Only held Thursday-Friday) (Start on Monday, July 4, 2022)

 Online 
 20 : On Air YouTube:

References

External links 

 
 

Aniporn Chalermburanawong
1994 births
Living people
Aniporn Chalermburanawong
Aniporn Chalermburanawong
Miss Universe 2015 contestants
Aniporn Chalermburanawong
Aniporn Chalermburanawong
Aniporn Chalermburanawong
Aniporn Chalermburanawong
Aniporn Chalermburanawong
Aniporn Chalermburanawong
Aniporn Chalermburanawong
Aniporn Chalermburanawong
Aniporn Chalermburanawong
Aniporn Chalermburanawong
Aniporn Chalermburanawong
Aniporn Chalermburanawong